Rafael Emilio Ramírez Peguero (born February 18, 1958), is a former professional baseball player. He played in Major League Baseball (MLB) primarily as a shortstop from 1980 to 1992.  Ramirez made his major league debut on August 4, 1980 for the Atlanta Braves of the National League (NL). Ramirez led the national league in errors from 1981-1983 as well as in 1985. He played his final game on October 3, 1992 as a member of the Houston Astros.

Career
One of a handful of ML players from the town of San Pedro de Macoris, Dominican Republic, Ramirez was the Braves' speedy, smooth-fielding shortstop from 1981 to 1986, leading NL shortstops in double plays four straight years while hitting quite well for his position. He made the NL All-Star team in 1984 with a .304 average at mid-season, but in 1987 torn knee ligaments limited him to only 56 games and he was traded to Houston after the season. With the Astros in 1988, Ramirez posted his best batting average since 1983 (.276) and drove in a career-high 59 runs. After that, his production slipped, with his batting average never again rising above .261, and plummeting as low as .236 in 1991. He retired following the 1992 season.

Sources

1958 births
Living people
Atlanta Braves players
Dominican Republic expatriate baseball players in the United States
Greenwood Braves players
Houston Astros players

Major League Baseball players from the Dominican Republic
Major League Baseball shortstops
National League All-Stars
Sportspeople from San Pedro de Macorís
Richmond Braves players
Savannah Braves players